James Cuffe may refer to:

 Sir James Cuffe (died 1678), Irish MP for Mayo 1661, grandfather of
 James Cuffe (died 1762) (1707–1762), Irish MP for Mayo 1742–61, father of
 James Cuffe, 1st Baron Tyrawley (1747–1821), Irish MP for Mayo 1768–97, for Donegal Borough 1776–77, for Tuam 1783, and peer, father of
 James Cuffe (died 1828) (1778–1828), Irish MP for Tralee 1819–28

See also
 James Cuffey (1911–1999), American astronomer